Agrupació Esportiva i Cultural Manlleu is a football team based in Manlleu, Spain. Founded in 1933, it plays in the Tercera División – Group 5. Its stadium is Municipal de Manlleu with a capacity of 3000 seats.

Season to season

8 seasons in Segunda División B
26 seasons in Tercera División

Current squad

Famous managers
 Fabri

External links
 AEC Manlleu Official website 
 Futbolme team profile 

 
Football clubs in Catalonia
Association football clubs established in 1933
1933 establishments in Spain